ο Ophiuchi, Latinized as Omicron Ophiuchi, is a wide double star in the equatorial constellation of Ophiuchus. The co-moving pair are visible to the naked eye as a dim point of light, with the two components having apparent visual magnitudes of 5.14 and 6.59. As of 2015, they had an angular separation of  along a position angle of 354°. The distance to both stars is approximately 281 light years based on parallax, and they are drifting closer to the Sun with a radial velocity of around −29 km/s.

The brighter member of the pair, designated component A, is an aging giant star with a stellar classification of G8III. With the supply of hydrogen at its core exhausted, it has expanded to 12 times the radius of the Sun. The star is radiating 75 times the Sun's luminosity from its enlarged photosphere at an effective temperature of 4,849 K. The secondary star, component B, has a class of F6IV-V, matching an F-type star with a luminosity class that is a blend of traits from a main sequence and a subgiant star. It has three times the Sun's radius and is radiating 12.6 times the Sun's luminosity at 6,296 K.

References

F-type subgiants
G-type giants
Double stars

Ophiuchus (constellation)
Ophiuchi, Omicron
Durchmusterung objects
Ophiuchi, 39
156349 50
084625 6
6424 5